A. bartschi may refer to:
 Aerodramus bartschi, the Mariana swiftlet or Guam swiftlet, a bird species
 Anolis bartschi, the West Cuban anole, a lizard species